Timo Barthel (born 3 April 1996) is a German diver. He specialises in 1-meter, 3-meter and synchronised events. He won the 2015 and 2017 German diving championships and was part of the extended selection for the 2016 Summer Olympics, however he could not secure a place in the final line up. His partner at synchronised event at the 2017 German championships was Florian Fandler.

References

External links
 

German male divers
1996 births
Living people
Divers at the 2014 Summer Youth Olympics
People from Würselen
Sportspeople from Cologne (region)
Divers at the 2020 Summer Olympics
Olympic divers of Germany
World Aquatics Championships medalists in diving
21st-century German people